The Swamp Thing is a superhero in American comic books published by DC Comics. A humanoid/plant elemental creature, created by writer Len Wein and artist Bernie Wrightson, the Swamp Thing has had several humanoid or monster incarnations in various different storylines. The character first appeared in House of Secrets #92 (July 1971) in a stand-alone horror story set in the early 20th century. The character then returned in a solo series, set in the contemporary world and in the general DC continuity. The character is a swamp monster that resembles an anthropomorphic mound of vegetable matter, and fights to protect his swamp home, the environment in general, and humanity from various supernatural or terrorist threats.

The character found perhaps its greatest popularity during the original 1970s Wein/Wrightson run and in the mid-late 1980s during a highly acclaimed run under Alan Moore, Stephen Bissette, and John Totleben. Swamp Thing would also go on to become one of the staples of the Justice League Dark team of magical superheroes.

The character has been adapted from the comics into several forms of media, including feature films, television series, and video games. The character made its live-action debut in the film Swamp Thing (1982), with Dick Durock playing the Swamp Thing, while Ray Wise played Alec Holland. Durock played both Swamp Thing and Holland in the sequel film The Return of Swamp Thing (1989). Durock reprised the role again in the television series Swamp Thing (1990). The Swamp Thing was played by Derek Mears with Andy Bean playing Alec Holland in the television series Swamp Thing (2019). Another live-action film adaptation, titled Swamp Thing, is in development as an installment of the DC Universe (DCU) media franchise. IGN ranked him 28th in the Top 100 Comic Book Heroes list.

Concept and creation
Len Wein came up with the idea for the character while riding a subway in Queens. He later recalled: "I didn't have a title for it, so I kept referring to it as 'that swamp thing I'm working on'. And that's how it got its name!" Bernie Wrightson designed the character's visual image, using a rough sketch by Wein as a guideline.

Publication history

Volume 1
Len Wein was the writer for the first 13 issues, before David Michelinie and Gerry Conway finished up the series. Burgeoning horror artist Bernie Wrightson drew the first 10 issues of the series, while Nestor Redondo drew a further 13 issues, the last issue being drawn by Fred Carrillo. The original creative team worked closely together; Wrightson recalled that during story conferences, Wein would walk around the office acting out all of the parts. The Swamp Thing fought against evil as he sought the men who murdered his wife and caused his monstrous transformation, as well as searching for a means to transform back into his human form.

The Swamp Thing has since fought many villains. Though they only met twice during the first series, the mad scientist Anton Arcane (with his obsession with gaining immortality) became the Swamp Thing's nemesis, even as the Swamp Thing developed a close bond with Arcane's niece Abigail Arcane. Arcane was aided by his nightmarish army of Un-Men and the Patchwork Man, alias Arcane's brother Gregori Arcane who, after a land mine explosion, was rebuilt as a Frankenstein Monster-type creature by his brother. Also involved in the conflict was the Swamp Thing's close friend-turned-enemy Lt. Matthew Joseph Cable, a federal agent who
originally mistakenly believed the Swamp Thing to be responsible for the deaths of Alec and Linda Holland.

As sales figures plummeted towards the end of the series, the writers attempted to revive interest by introducing fantastical creatures, aliens, and even Alec Holland's brother, Edward (a character that was never referred to again by later writers) into the picture.

The last two issues saw the Swamp Thing transformed back into Alec Holland and having to fight one last menace as an ordinary human. The series was cancelled with issue #24 and a blurb for a 25th issue containing an upcoming encounter with Hawkman led nowhere. Alec Holland's transformation back into the Swamp Thing was covered in Challengers of the Unknown #81-87, within which the Swamp Thing is enlisted by the titular team to fight the Lovecraftian cosmic threat M'nagalah, whom the Swamp Thing had encountered during Wein's run.

The Saga of the Swamp Thing and Volume 2

In 1982, DC Comics revived the Swamp Thing series, attempting to capitalize on the summer 1982 release of the Wes Craven film of the same name. A revival had been planned for 1978, but was a victim of the DC Implosion. The new series called, The Saga of the Swamp Thing, featured an adaptation of the Craven film in its first annual. Now written by Martin Pasko, the book loosely picked up after the Swamp Thing's guest appearances in Challengers of the Unknown #81-87, DC Comics Presents #8, and The Brave and the Bold #172, with the character wandering around the swamps of Louisiana seen as an urban legend and feared by locals. Pasko's main arc depicted the Swamp Thing roaming the globe, trying to stop a young girl (and the possible Anti-Christ) named Karen Clancy from destroying the world.

When Pasko had to give up work on the title due to increasing television commitments, editor Len Wein assigned the title to British writer Alan Moore. When Karen Berger took over as editor, she gave Moore free rein to revamp the title and the character as he saw fit. Moore reconfigured the Swamp Thing's origin to make him a true monster, as opposed to a human transformed into a monster. In his first issue, he swept aside most of the supporting cast that Pasko had introduced in his year-and-a-half run as writer and brought the Sunderland Corporation to the forefront, as they hunted the Swamp Thing down and "killed" him in a hail of bullets. The subsequent investigation revealed that the Swamp Thing was not Alec Holland transformed into a plant, but actually a wholly plant-based entity created upon the death of Alec Holland, having somehow absorbed duplicates of Holland's consciousness and memories into himself. He is described as "a plant that thought it was Alec Holland, a plant that was trying its level best to be Alec Holland". This is explained as a result of the plant matter of the swamp absorbing Holland's bio-restorative formula, with the Swamp Thing's appearance being the plants' attempt to duplicate Holland's human form. This revelation resulted in the Swamp Thing suffering a temporary mental breakdown and identity crisis, but he eventually re-asserted himself in time to stop the latest scheme of the Floronic Man.

Issue #32 was a strange twist of comedy and tragedy, as the Swamp Thing encounters an alien version of Pogo, Walt Kelly's character.

Moore would later reveal, in an attempt to connect the original one-off Swamp Thing story from House of Secrets #92 to the main Swamp Thing canon, that there had been dozens, perhaps hundreds, of Swamp Things since the dawn of humanity, and that all versions of the creature were designated defenders of the Parliament of Trees, an elemental community which rules a dimension known as "the Green" that connects all plant life on Earth. Moore's Swamp Thing broadened the scope of the series to include ecological and spiritual concerns while retaining its horror-fantasy roots. In issue #37, Moore formally introduced the character of John Constantine the Hellblazer as a magician/con artist who would lead the Swamp Thing on the "American Gothic" storyline. Alan Moore also introduced the concept of the DC characters Cain and Abel being the mystical reincarnations of the Biblical Cain and Abel caught in an endless cycle of murder and resurrection.

The Saga of the Swamp Thing was the first mainstream comic book series to completely abandon the Comics Code Authority's approval.

With issue #65, regular penciler Rick Veitch took over from Moore and began scripting the series, continuing the story in a roughly similar vein for 24 more issues. Veitch's term ended in 1989 due to a widely publicized creative dispute, when DC refused to publish issue #88 because of the use of Jesus Christ as a character, despite having previously approved the script in which the Swamp Thing is a cupbearer who offers Jesus water when he calls for it from the cross. The series was handed to Doug Wheeler, who made the cup that the Shining Knight believed to be the Holy Grail to be a cup used in a religious ceremony by a Neanderthal tribe that was about to be wiped out by Cro-Magnons, in the published version of issue #88. Beginning in issue #90, Wheeler reintroduced Matango, a character that Stephen Bissette had introduced in Swamp Thing Annual #4.

After a period of high creative turnover, in 1991 DC sought to revive interest in Swamp Thing by bringing horror writer Nancy A. Collins on board to write the series. Starting with Swamp Thing Annual #6, Collins moved on to write Swamp Thing (vol. 2) #110–138, dramatically overhauling the series by restoring the pre-Alan Moore tone and incorporating a new set of supporting cast members into the book. Collins resurrected Anton Arcane, along with the Sunderland Corporation, as foils for the Swamp Thing. Her stories tended to be ecologically based and at one point featured giant killer flowers.

With issue #140 (March 1994), the title was handed over to Grant Morrison for a four-issue story arc, co-written by the then-unknown Mark Millar. As Collins had destroyed the status quo of the series, Morrison sought to shake the book up with a four-part storyline which had the Swamp Thing plunged into a nightmarish dreamworld scenario where he was split into two separate beings: Alec Holland and the Swamp Thing, which was now a mindless being of pure destruction. Millar then took over from Morrison with issue #144, and launched what was initially conceived as an ambitious 25-part storyline where the Swamp Thing would be forced to go upon a series of trials against rival elemental forces. Millar brought the series to a close with issue #171 in a finale where the Swamp Thing becomes the master of all elemental forces, including the planet.

Volume 3
Written by Brian K. Vaughan and drawn by Roger Petersen and Giuseppe Camuncoli in 2001, the third Swamp Thing series focused on the daughter of the Swamp Thing, Tefé Holland. Even though she was chronologically 11–12, the series had Tefé aged into the body of an 18-year-old with a mindwipe orchestrated by the Swamp Thing, Constantine and Abby to try to control her darker impulses, brought about by her exposure to the Parliament of Trees. Due to the circumstances under which she was conceived, the Swamp Thing, possessing John Constantine, was not aware that he was given a blood transfusion by a demon. She held power over both plants and flesh.

Believing herself to be a normal human girl named Mary who had miraculously recovered from cancer three years prior, she rediscovers her powers and identity when she finds her boyfriend and best friend betraying her on prom night. In a moment of anger, her powers manifest and she kills them both. Tefé then fakes her own death and embarks on a series of misadventures that take her across the country, and ultimately to Africa, in search of a mythical "Tree of Knowledge".

During this series, it seems that the Swamp Thing and Abigail have reunited as lovers and are living in their old home in the Louisiana swamps outside Houma. The home in which they live more closely resembles the one that the Swamp Thing constructs for Abigail during the Moore run than the home in which they dwell during the Collins run. In a confrontation with Tefé, the Swamp Thing explains that he has cut himself off from the Green and there seems to be no trace of the god-like powers he acquired from the Parliaments of Air, Waves, Stone or Flames during the Millar run. Also, Vaughan's Swamp Thing does not seem to have been divorced from the humanity of his Alec Holland self. The disconnection between these two entities becomes a plot point in Volume 4.

Volume 4
A fourth series began in 2004, with writers Andy Diggle (#1–6), Will Pfeifer (#7–8) and Joshua Dysart (#9–29). In this latest series, the Swamp Thing is reverted to his plant-based Earth elemental status after the first story line, and he attempts to live an "eventless" life in the Louisiana swamps. Tefé, likewise, is rendered powerless and mortal. Issue #29 was intended to be the final issue of the fourth volume, which was cancelled due to low sales numbers.

Return to the DC Universe

Brightest Day

The conclusion of the crossover event Brightest Day revealed that the Swamp Thing had become corrupted by the personality of the villain Nekron in the wake of the Blackest Night crossover event. The Swamp Thing now believed himself to be Nekron, similar to how he had once believed himself to be Alec Holland. The Swamp Thing went on a rampage in Star City, ultimately seeking to destroy all life on Earth. The Entity within the White Lantern used several heroes, including Hawkman, Hawkgirl, Firestorm, the Martian Manhunter, Aquaman and Deadman to slow the rampage and to construct a new Swamp Thing based on the body of Alec Holland. Instead of merely thinking that it was Holland, this version of the Swamp Thing would actually be him. The new Swamp Thing defeated and killed the corrupted and original Swamp Thing. The Swamp Thing then restored life to natural areas around the world and declared that those who hurt the Green would face his wrath. He also restored Aquaman, Firestorm, Hawkman, and the Martian Manhunter to normal. The book ended with the Swamp Thing killing several businessmen who engaged in deliberate, illegal polluting activities.

Brightest Day Aftermath: The Search for the Swamp Thing
This three–issue miniseries follows immediately after the events of Brightest Day, and follows the actions of John Constantine as he tries to work out what has changed with the Swamp Thing and track him down, with the assistance of Zatanna, the Batman, and Superman.

Volume 5
DC Comics relaunched Swamp Thing with issue #1 in September 2011 as part of The New 52, with writer Scott Snyder (#1-18 and Annual). Snyder's run concluded with "Rotworld", a crossover event between Swamp Thing, Animal Man and Frankenstein, Agent of S.H.A.D.E. Charles Soule wrote issues #19-40.

Volume 6
A six–issue miniseries written by Len Wein, co-creator of the Swamp Thing, with art by Kelley Jones was released between March and August 2016.

The Swamp Thing
A 16-issue miniseries retitled with a "The" at the beginning written by Ram V with art by Mike Perkins began publication in March 2021. The book focuses on a new character named Levi Kami taking up the Swamp Thing mantle while the second Swamp Thing, Alec Holland, is off-world. Originally planned as a 10-issue miniseries, The Swamp Thing has been extended to 16 issues, with The Swamp Thing #10 followed by a short hiatus before returning in March 2022.

Fictional character biography

Alex Olsen
Alexander "Alex" Olsen was a talented young scientist in Louisiana in the early 1900s, married to Linda. Alex's assistant, Damian Ridge, was secretly in love with Linda and plotted the death of his friend. He tampered with Olsen's chemicals, killing him in the explosion, and dumped his body in the nearby swamp. Ridge used Linda's grief to convince her to marry him; however, Ridge was confronted by Alex Olsen, now a risen humanoid pile of vegetable matter. Olsen killed Ridge but Linda did not recognize him and ran away, leaving Olsen to wander the swamps alone as a monster.

Alec Holland

Albert Höllerer
Albert Hollerer is a German airplane pilot who fought in World War II and was shot down over a bog in 1942. In the wake of his death in which he was burned alive, he became the Swamp Thing of that era. For years, he walked the Earth, keeping a small airplane toy with him as the only memory of his former life. In 1954, the creature finally found peace among the Parliament of Trees. This corresponds with the fictional biography and dates of Hillman Periodicals' character The Heap, published 1942–1953.

Tefé Holland

Allan Hallman
Alan Hallman was selected by the Parliament of Trees to be the planet's Earth elemental before Alec Holland became the Swamp Thing. He had been a scientist working on a formula to repair damaged crops when the Parliament chose him, and he died in flames, as all Earth elementals must. While traversing the Green, he was captured within a creature of the Grey, which broke him down and converted him into fungus and mold. He was recreated as an emissary of the Grey by Matango, who gathered Hallman's consciousness back together in his Chamber of Dreams. With Matango's return from Hell, Alan Hallman was released into the Green to find and capture the Swamp Thing and his daughter Tefé and force them to surrender their individuality to the Grey.

Aaron Hayley
Aaron Hayley is an American soldier in World War II, who was slain and arose as the Swamp Thing. Since there was already an active plant elemental at the time (Albert Höllerer), he was only active as the Swamp Thing for a short time, and soon took his place among the Parliament of Trees.

Calbraith A. H. Rodgers
Calbraith A. H. Rodgers was born in England in 1920. Ever since he was a boy, he had heard whispers from the leaves, the flowers and the trees that something great and terrible would be waiting for him on the other side. Afraid of what would be waiting for him on the other side of death, he enlisted in the Royal Air Force to try and escape the pull of the Green. On May 3, 1942, on his fourth mission as a pilot during World War II, his plane was shot down. Landing in a swamp, the dying Rodgers felt the branches and petals reaching for him, delivering him to his new life as the protector of the Green. By fusing the man with the Green in the final moments of his life, the Swamp Thing was created.

Rodgers served a number of years as the Swamp Thing before taking his place in the Parliament of Trees, the final resting place of his predecessors, where his consciousness would live on as the flesh of his body died. Rodgers would later leave the Parliament of Trees to become the Swamp Thing once again to warn Alec Holland of the coming of both the Rot and Sethe, the enemy that the Swamp Thing was born to defend the Green against. Rodgers knew that to remove his consciousness from the Parliament of Trees would mean true death. After delivering his message to Alec and warning him to stay away from Abigail Arcane, he died.

Jon Haraldson

In the 2020 crossover event "Endless Winter", the spirit of Jon Haraldson, the Viking Prince was summoned to the present day and temporarily made an agent of the Green to become a new Swamp Thing and fight the Frost King. At the end of the story, he chose to return his spirit to Valhalla.

Levi Kamei
The newest Swamp Thing and the protagonist of the 16-issue The Swamp Thing miniseries in 2021.

Powers and abilities
In physical form, the Swamp Thing is a chlorokinetic-transmorphic elemental entity, an Avatar of "The Green" (the plane of existence for the hive-mind and life force of all plant life on Earth). The Swamp Thing can inhabit and animate vegetable matter anywhere, including alien plants, even sentient ones, and construct it into a body for himself. As a result, bodily attacks mean little to him, he can easily regrow damaged or severed body parts, and can even transport himself across the globe by leaving his current form, transferring his consciousness to a new form grown from whatever vegetable matter is present in the location that he wishes to reach. He even grew himself a form out of John Constantine's meager tobacco supply on one occasion.

The Swamp Thing is normally human-sized or slightly larger than average, but he can grow bodies much larger. He once used Sequoioideae to grow a body the size of an office block.

The Swamp Thing possesses superhuman strength; the Swamp Thing's strength has never been portrayed as prominently as many of his other abilities. DC's The New 52 continuity made several changes, though mostly highlighting previous abilities and a physical look not dissimilar from previous incarnations. The New 52 reboot did bring the Swamp Thing further into the shared universe continuity by placing him permanently in the Justice League Dark team lineup, partnering with many familiar faces like John Constantine, Zatanna and Deadman. The Swamp Thing's powers and abilities make him the true powerhouse of the team. His power limits have yet to be established. He has demonstrated sufficient strength to rip large trees out of the ground with ease and trade blows with the likes of Etrigan the Demon.

The Swamp Thing can control any form of plant life, he can make it bend to his will or accelerate its growth. This control even extends to alien life, as he once cured Superman of an infection caused by exposure to a Kryptonian plant that was driving Superman mad and causing his body to burn out its own power.

After Mark Millar's run, the Swamp Thing had also mastered the elements of Fire, Earth, Water and Air; the Parliaments of each were later killed by the Word, implying that he has retained these abilities and has the power once held by the Parliaments; this has yet to be explained.

The new Swamp Thing (a resurrected Alec Holland) has no power over a White Lantern Power Ring, but he can control all forms of plant life and even grow every kind even if it is unknown to him; he can also grow from any plant life anywhere, dead or alive; this is seen when the Seeder (the Floronic Man now endowed with power by the Parliament of Trees and with his mind splintered as a result of the events of Infinite Crisis) creates a portal to the Moon and banishes him there. Holland then simply resurrects himself back on Earth from the plants growing on the Seeder's face.

Other versions
 In JLA: The Nail, Holland appears as an advisor to the President and Wonder Woman makes reference to her stopping an attempt to steal details of his bio-restorative serum. Holland is apparently killed when the White House is destroyed in an attempt to frame Wonder Woman as an alien invader, averting any possibility that he will serve as the template for the Swamp Thing.
 In the alternate history of DC Comics Bombshells, the Swamp Thing is a lesovik, one of many magical creatures from Russian folklore to emerge to fight alongside the Soviets in the Siege of Leningrad.

In other media

Television

Live-action

 The Alec Holland incarnation of Swamp Thing appears in an anti-littering public service announcement aired on behalf of Greenpeace, coinciding with the release of the film The Return of Swamp Thing (1989).
 The Alec Holland incarnation of Swamp Thing appears in a self-titled TV series (1990), with Dick Durock reprising the title role from the original Swamp Thing films.
 It was rumored that Swamp Thing would appear in an episode of Constantine, but the show was cancelled before this could be proved or disproved.
 The Alec Holland incarnation of Swamp Thing appears in a self-titled TV series (2019), portrayed by Andy Bean and Derek Mears in a "physical costume" respectively. This version was created after Holland was killed while investigating a swamp-borne virus plaguing Marais, Louisiana before the swamp absorbed his memories and placed them in an anthropomorphic plant, which later became known as Swamp Thing.
 Mears as Swamp Thing makes a cameo appearance in the Arrowverse crossover "Crisis on Infinite Earths" via archival footage from the episode "Loose Ends".

Animation
 Swamp Thing stories appear in Video Comics (1979-1981), an early series on Nickelodeon consisting of narrated comic book panels.
 The Alec Holland incarnation of Swamp Thing appears in a self-titled TV series (1991), voiced by Len Carlson.
 The Alec Holland incarnation of Swamp Thing makes a cameo appearance in the Justice League episode "Comfort and Joy".
 The Alec Holland incarnation of Swamp Thing appears in Justice League Action, voiced by Mark Hamill.
 The Alec Holland incarnation of Swamp Thing appears in Harley Quinn, voiced by Sam Richardson.

Film
 The Alec Holland incarnation of Swamp Thing appears in a self-titled film (1982), portrayed by Ray Wise and Dick Durock respectively.
 The Alec Holland incarnation of Swamp Thing appears in The Return of Swamp Thing, with Dick Durock reprising the role and Ray Wise reappearing in a flashback via archive footage from the preceding film. This version of Swamp Thing is Holland's consciousness reconstituted through plant life.
 The documentary film The Mindscape of Alan Moore contains a psychedelic animation piece based on The Saga of the Swamp Thing (vol. 2) #29 ("Love and Death").
 An unnamed, alternate universe incarnation of Swamp Thing makes a non-speaking cameo appearance in Justice League: Crisis on Two Earths as a minor member of the Crime Syndicate.
 The Alec Holland incarnation of Swamp Thing appears in the DC Universe Animated Original Movies series of films, voiced primarily by Roger R. Cross. This version is a member of the Justice League Dark. He appears in Justice League Dark and Justice League Dark: Apokolips War.
 The Alec Holland incarnation of Swamp Thing appears in the DC Animated Universe film Batman and Harley Quinn, voiced by John DiMaggio.
 The Alec Holland incarnation of Swamp Thing appears in Teen Titans Go! To the Movies.
 On January 31, 2023, a self-titled Swamp Thing horror film was announced to be in development at DC Studios. The following day, The Hollywood Reporter confirmed that James Mangold was in early talks to direct the film after the releases of Indiana Jones and the Dial of Destiny and his upcoming Bob Dylan biopic A Complete Unknown.

Video games
 The Alec Holland incarnation of Swamp Thing appears as a playable character in a self-titled video game based on the Swamp Thing animated series.
 The Alec Holland incarnation of Swamp Thing appears as a playable character in DC Universe Online, voiced by Chilimbwe Washington.
 The Alec Holland incarnation of Swamp Thing appears as a playable character in Lego Batman 3: Beyond Gotham, voiced by JB Blanc.
 The Alec Holland incarnation of Swamp Thing appears as a playable character in Infinite Crisis, voiced by Michael Dorn.
 The Alec Holland incarnation of Swamp Thing appears as a playable character in Injustice 2, voiced by Fred Tatasciore.
 The Alec Holland incarnation of Swamp Thing appears as a playable character in Lego DC Super-Villains as part of the "Justice League Dark" DLC pack.

Miscellaneous
 Swamp Thing appears in Super Friends #28 as an enemy of the titular Super Friends.
 Swamp Thing appears in the Injustice: Gods Among Us prequel comic. He sides with Superman's Regime because of their efforts to prevent cataclysmic harm to the environment. When Batman and John Constantine attempt to recruit him into the former's Insurgency, Swamp Thing lets them go in light of his history with the latter, but warns them he will not be lenient next time they meet. During a fight between the Regime and Insurgency, Swamp Thing battles Poison Ivy until they are forced to preserve Earth when Trigon and Mister Mxyzptlk's fight threatens to tear reality apart. Despite the Flash's best efforts, Swamp Thing is trapped in Hell at the last minute.

Awards
Over the years, the Swamp Thing series has been nominated for and won several awards. Len Wein won the 1972 Shazam Award for "Best Writer (Dramatic Division)" and Berni Wrightson won the Shazam Award for "Best Penciller (Dramatic Division)" that same year for their work on Swamp Thing. Wein and Wrightson also won the Shazam Award for "Best Individual Story (Dramatic)" in 1972 for "Dark Genesis" in Swamp Thing #1. The series won the Shazam Award for "Best Continuing Feature" in 1973.

Alan Moore won the 1985 and 1986 Jack Kirby Awards for "Best Writer" for Swamp Thing. Moore, John Totleben, and Steve Bissette won the 1985 Jack Kirby Award for "Best Single Issue" for Swamp Thing Annual #2. They also won the 1985, 1986, and 1987 Jack Kirby Awards for "Best Continuing Series" for Swamp Thing.

References

External links

 Swamp Thing at the Continuity Pages
 Swamp Thing Annotations (Moore/Veitch Era)
 
 Arcane Knowledge: A Guide To The Swamp Thing TV Series
 Swamp Thing and Man-Thing and  Don Markstein's Toonopedia
 Roots of the Swamp Thing

Further reading
 "A Tale from the Swamp: The Origin of Wein & Wrightson's Swamp Thing," Comic Book Artist #1 (Spring 1998), pp. 28–29: interviews with Len Wein, Bernie Wrightson, and Joe Orlando.

 
1972 comics debuts
1982 comics debuts
2001 comics debuts
2004 comics debuts
2011 comics debuts
2016 comics debuts
2021 comics debuts
DC Comics adapted into films
Characters created by Len Wein
Comics adapted into animated series
Comics adapted into television series
DC Comics adapted into video games
Comics characters introduced in 1971
DC Comics characters with accelerated healing
DC Comics characters with superhuman strength
DC Comics characters who are shapeshifters
DC Comics characters who can teleport
DC Comics deities
DC Comics fantasy characters
DC Comics film characters
DC Comics plant characters
DC Comics scientists
DC Comics male superheroes
DC Comics television characters
DC Comics titles
Defunct American comics
Fantasy comics
Fictional characters from Louisiana
Fictional characters who can stretch themselves
Fictional characters with plant abilities
Fictional characters with spirit possession or body swapping abilities
Fictional characters with superhuman durability or invulnerability
Fictional conservationists and environmentalists
Fictional monsters
Fictional pacifists
Fictional superorganisms
Fighting game characters
Male horror film characters
Louisiana in fiction
Fiction about reincarnation